Jack of All Trades is a 2007 album by Stones Throw rapper, and Lootpack member Wildchild. The album was primarily produced by Stones Throw artists Madlib and Oh No, along with Georgia Anne Muldrow, as well as outside producers Black Milk and others.

Track listing

2007 albums
Wildchild (rapper) albums
Albums produced by Black Milk
Albums produced by Madlib
Albums produced by Oh No (musician)